57th parallel may refer to:

57th parallel north, a circle of latitude in the Northern Hemisphere
57th parallel south, a circle of latitude in the Southern Hemisphere